Shamiani (Magofu ya mji wa kale wa Shamiani in Swahili )  is protected historic site located inside Mkoani District of Pemba South Region in Tanzania. The site is home to partially excavated abandoned medieval Swahili ruins with a brief occupation period from about 14th to 16th century.

References

Swahili people
Swahili city-states
Swahili culture
Pemba Island